William Berners may refer to:

William Barnes (died 1558), or William Berners, MP
William Barnes (died 1559), or William Berners, MP for Wigan
William Barne (died 1562), or William Berners, MP
William Berners (1679–1712), MP for Hythe
William Berners (property developer) (1709–1783), English property developer and slave owner